Zunongwangia endophytica is a Gram-negative and rod-shaped bacterium from the genus of Zunongwangia which has been isolated from the plant Halimione portulacoides from Ria de Aveiro in Portugal.

References

Flavobacteria
Bacteria described in 2017